Events from the year 1958 in the United Kingdom.

Incumbents
 Monarch – Elizabeth II
 Prime Minister – Harold Macmillan (Conservative)
Parliament – 41st

Events
 6 January – Chancellor of the Exchequer Peter Thorneycroft together with junior Treasury Ministers Enoch Powell and Nigel Birch resign over Cabinet opposition to spending cuts, an event dismissed to the Press the following day by the Prime Minister as "little local difficulties".
 14 January – TWW, the ITV franchise for South Wales and the West of England goes on the air. 
 6 February – the Manchester United F.C. team plane flying back from a European Cup tie in Belgrade crashes on take-off after refuelling at Munich Airport in West Germany. 21 of the 44 people on board are killed. Seven of them are Manchester United players: captain and left-back Roger Byrne (aged 28), centre-half Mark Jones (aged 24), right-half Eddie Colman (aged 21), centre-forward Tommy Taylor (aged 26), full-back Geoff Bent (aged 25), left-winger David Pegg (aged 22), and inside-forward Billy Whelan (aged 22). Eight of the nine sports journalists travelling on the plane are also killed, including the former Manchester City and England national football team goalkeeper Frank Swift. Among the survivors are 10 United players and manager Matt Busby, who is reported to be seriously injured. Outside-right Johnny Berry and left-half Duncan Edwards are also reported to be in a serious condition.
 20 February – the government announces plans to close the 300-year-old naval dockyards at Sheerness on the Isle of Sheppey, which would result in more than 2,500 workers losing their jobs.
 21 February – Duncan Edwards dies of his injuries in a Munich hospital fifteen days after the Munich air crash. Edwards, twenty-one years old and rated by many as the finest player in England, is the eighth Manchester United player to die.
 25 February – Bertrand Russell launches the Campaign for Nuclear Disarmament, initiated at a meeting called by Canon John Collins on 15 January. The campaign symbol has been launched on 21 February by Gerald Holtom.
 27 February – the final death toll of the Munich air disaster reaches 23 with the death of co-pilot Kenneth Rayment in hospital.
 28 February – the Victorian Society, the pressure group for Victorian architecture, holds its first meeting.
 March – removal of Derbyshire county administrative headquarters from Derby to Matlock begins.
 2 March – a British team led by Sir Vivian Fuchs completes the first crossing of the Antarctic using Sno-Cat caterpillar tractors and dogsled teams in 99 days.
 19 March – official opening by Prince Philip, Duke of Edinburgh of the London Planetarium, the first planetarium in Britain. Public presentations commence on 20 March.
 24 March – work on the M1, Britain's first full-length motorway, begins. The first stretch of the motorway, due to open next year, will run from London to the Warwickshire-Northamptonshire border. During the 1960s, the remainder of the motorway will be built to give London an unbroken motorway link with Leeds some 200 miles away.
 29 March – Mary Elizabeth Wilson of Windy Nook in County Durham is convicted as a serial mariticide.
 1 April – BBC Radiophonic Workshop created.
 4–7 April – the first protest march for the Campaign for Nuclear Disarmament from Trafalgar Square to Aldermaston, Berkshire, demanding a ban on nuclear weapons.
 7 April – the Church of England gives its moral backing to family planning.
 27 April – BOAC's first de Havilland Comet 4 makes its maiden flight.
 30 April
 The Life Peerages Act receives Royal Assent; the Act allows the creation of life peers who can sit in the House of Lords. As life peerages could be bestowed on women, this Act allows for women to sit in the House of Lords for the first time.
 The musical My Fair Lady, starring Rex Harrison and Julie Andrews, opens in London's Drury Lane theatre.
 3 May – Bolton Wanderers win the FA Cup for the fourth time in their history with a 2–0 win over Manchester United at Wembley Stadium. Both goals are scored by centre-forward Nat Lofthouse.
 21 May – United Kingdom Postmaster General Ernest Marples announces that from December, Subscriber Trunk Dialling will be introduced in the Bristol area.
 27 May – Shelagh Delaney's A Taste of Honey staged by Theatre Workshop at the Theatre Royal Stratford East.
 4 June – the Duke of Edinburgh's Award presented for the first time at Buckingham Palace.
 7 June – Ian Donald publishes an article in The Lancet which describes the diagnostic use of ultrasound in obstetrics as pioneered in Glasgow.
 9 June – the Queen officially reopens Gatwick Airport, which has been expanded at a cost of more than £7,000,000.
 18 June – Benjamin Britten's one-act opera Noye's Fludde premiered at the Aldeburgh Festival.
 3 July
 1958 US–UK Mutual Defence Agreement signed in Washington, D.C.
 Last débutante formally presented to the Queen, at Holyroodhouse in Edinburgh.
 10 July – first parking meters installed in the UK.
 17 July – British paratroopers arrive in Jordan: King Hussein has asked for help against pressure from Iraq.
 18–26 July – British Empire and Commonwealth Games held in Cardiff.
 24 July – the first life peerage is created.
 26 July
 Elizabeth II gives her son Charles (now Charles III) the customary title of Prince of Wales.
 Abolition of the presentation of débutantes to the royal court.
 1 August
 Ian Fraser, Baron Fraser of Lonsdale becomes the first life peer.
 Premiere of Carry on Sergeant, the first Carry On film.
 8 August – Barbara Wootton, Baroness Wootton of Abinger becomes the first female peer in her own right.
 28 August – first Miss United Kingdom beauty pageant held, on Blackpool beach; Eileen Sheridan of Walton-on-Thames is the winner.
 29 August
 Project Emily: The first United States Thor missile is delivered to the UK, for operation by No. 77 Squadron RAF at RAF Feltwell.
 Cliff Richard's debut single Move It is released, reaching #2 in the charts. It is credited with being one of the first authentic rock and roll songs produced outside the United States.
 30 August
 Notting Hill race riots in London.
 Southern Television, the ITV franchise for the South of England goes on the air. 
 1 September – the first Cod War between UK and Iceland breaks out.
 5 September – a severe storm over the South-East of England seriously disrupts communications.
 16 September – relaxation of restrictions on hire purchase.
 1 October – the sovereignty of Christmas Island is transferred from the United Kingdom to Australia.
 4 October – BOAC uses new Comet jets to become the first airline to fly jet passenger services across the Atlantic.
 11 October – first broadcast of the long-running BBC Television sports programme Grandstand.
 16 October – first broadcast of the long-running BBC Television children's programme Blue Peter.
 19 October – by finishing second in the Moroccan Grand Prix, Mike Hawthorn becomes the first British racing driver to win the Formula One World Championship.
 21 October – the first life peers, including the first female peers, enter the House of Lords. The Baronesses Swanborough (Stella Isaacs, Marchioness of Reading) and Wootton (Barbara Wootton) are the first women to take their seats.
 25 October – the Short SC.1 experimental VTOL aircraft makes its first free vertical flight.
 28 October – the State Opening of Parliament is broadcast on television for the first time.
 10 November – Donald Campbell sets the world water speed record at 248.62 mph.
 24 November – exhibition of computers held at Earl's Court, London; the first of its kind in the world.
 25 November – the Austin FX4 London taxi goes on sale, it will remain in production until 1997. 
 30 November – during the live broadcast of the Armchair Theatre play Underground on the ITV network, actor Gareth Jones has a fatal heart attack between scenes.
 5 December 
 The Preston Bypass, the UK's first motorway, is opened by Prime Minister Harold Macmillan.
 Subscriber Trunk Dialling (STD) is inaugurated by The Queen when she dials a call from Bristol to Edinburgh and speaks to Lord Provost.
 First service by a Royal National Lifeboat Institution  self-righting life-boat, RNLB J.G. Graves of Sheffield (ON 942) at Scarborough.
 10 December – English biochemist Frederick Sanger wins his first Nobel Prize in Chemistry "for his work on the structure of proteins, especially that of insulin" (his second comes in 1980).
 24 December – 1958 Bristol Britannia 312 crash: a BOAC Bristol Britannia airliner crashes near Winkton in Hampshire on a routine test flight.

Undated
 First boutique, His Clothes, to be opened in Carnaby Street, London, by John Stephen.
 British Nylon Spinners introduce the name Bri-Nylon.
 The first Little Chef diner is opened in Reading, Berkshire, by Sam Alper.
 German-born British mathematician Klaus Roth wins the Fields Medal for his work on the Thue–Siegel–Roth theorem.
 The British Rally Championship in motor sport begins its first year.

Publications
 H. E. Bates' novel The Darling Buds of May, first in the Larkin family series.
 John Betjeman's Collected Poems.
 Michael Bond's children's story A Bear Called Paddington, introducing the character Paddington Bear.
 Agatha Christie's novel Ordeal by Innocence.
 Lawrence Durrell's novels Balthazar and Mountolive from The Alexandria Quartet.
 Ian Fleming's James Bond novel Dr. No.
 Graham Greene's novel Our Man in Havana.
 Dr D. G. Hessayon's guide Be Your Own Gardening Expert, first in the best selling gardening book series in history.
 Alan Sillitoe's first novel Saturday Night and Sunday Morning.
 T.H. White's Arthurian novel The Once and Future King.
 Raymond Williams' book Culture and Society.
 Michael Young's satirical essay The Rise of the Meritocracy.
 Bunty comic first published.

Births

 2 January – Helen Goodman, English lawyer and politician
 4 January – Julian Sands, English actor
 9 January – Stephen Neale, English philosopher and academic
 10 January – Caroline Langrishe, English actress
 24 January – Jools Holland, British musician
 27 January – Alan Milburn, British Labour politician and MP for Darlington
 29 January – Linda Smith, comedian (died 2006)
 1 February – Eleanor Laing, British Conservative politician, MP for Epping Forest, and Shadow Minister for Women
 6 February – Tim Dakin, English bishop and missionary
 7 February – Matt Ridley, English science writer
 10 February – Billy Thomson, Scottish footballer (d. 2023)
 11 February – Michael Jackson, British broadcast executive
 12 February – Steve Grand, English computer scientist
 17 February – Steve Fox, footballer and gardener (d. 2012)
 19 February – Steve Nieve, musician
 20 February – James Wilby, actor
 26 February – Paul Ackford, rugby player
 28 February – Ian Burnett, Lord Chief Justice
 1 March – Nik Kershaw, English pop singer-songwriter
 3 March – Miranda Richardson, English actress
 5 March – Andy Gibb, English-born pop singer-songwriter (died 1988)
 8 March – Gary Numan, English new wave singer
 10 March – Garth Crooks, English football player and pundit
 13 March 
 Caryl Phillips, Saint Kitts-born writer
 Linda Robson, English actress
 16 March – Chris Mole, British Labour politician and MP for Ipswich
 18 March – Neil Brand, British writer and composer
 21 March – Gary Oldman, English actor
 6 April
 Graeme Base, English-born Australian children's illustrator and author
 Jackie Gallagher, English footballer
 9 April – Nadey Hakim, British-Lebanese surgeon and sculptor
 11 April – Stuart Adamson, Scottish rock singer and guitarist (Big Country) (d. 2001)  
 12 April – Will Sergeant, English rock guitarist (Echo & the Bunnymen)
 14 April – Peter Capaldi, Scottish actor and director
 15 April
 Abu Hamza al-Masri, Muslim cleric convicted of inciting racial hatred and murder
 Sir Robert Smith, 3rd Baronet, British Liberal Democrat politician and MP for West Aberdeenshire and Kincardine
 Benjamin Zephaniah, British poet and musician
 18 April – Saviour Pirotta, British/Maltese children's author 
 24 April – Brian Paddick, British police commander
 25 April – Fish, Scottish rock singer
 3 May – Sandi Toksvig, Danish-born comedian, author and broadcast presenter
 4 May
 Caroline Spelman, British Conservative politician, MP for Meriden, Shadow Secretary of State for Local and Devolved Government Affairs
 Jane Kennedy, British Labour politician, MP for Liverpool Wavertree
 8 May – Brooks Newmark, American-English businessman and politician, Lord of the Treasury
 17 May – Paul Whitehouse, Welsh comedian and actor
 18 May – Toyah Willcox, actress and singer
 22 May – Denise Welch, English actress
 25 May – Paul Weller, English singer-songwriter (The Jam, The Style Council)
 3 June – Simon Fraser, diplomat
 5 June – Graeme Crallan, heavy metal drummer (died 2008)
 6 June – Paul Burrell, butler to Princess Diana
 7 June – Ivan Henderson, British Labour politician and MP for Harwich
 11 June – Barry Adamson, English singer and bass player
 14 June – Nick Van Eede, pop rock singer-songwriter, frontman for Cutting Crew
 18 June – Gary Martin, voice actor and actor 
 23 June – John Henry Hayes, British Conservative politician, MP for South Holland and The Deepings, and Chairman of the Cornerstone Group
 30 June – Pam Royle, British television presenter, journalist and voice coach 
 July – Huw Dixon, Welsh economist
 1 July – Les Morton, English racewalker
 6 July – Jennifer Saunders, English comedy actress
 9 July – Robin Kermode, English actor, author and communications coach
 11 July – Mark Lester, child actor
 17 July – Suzanne Moore, English journalist 
 24 July – Joe McGann, English actor
 27 July 
 Christopher Dean, ice dancer, Olympic gold medallist
 Vincenzo Nicoli, actor
 30 July
 Kate Bush, British singer and songwriter
 Daley Thompson, decathlete, Olympic gold medallist
 7 August – Bruce Dickinson, English heavy metal singer
 10 August – Rosie Winterton, British Labour politician, MP for Doncaster Central and member of the Privy Council
 13 August – Feargal Sharkey, Northern Irish punk rock lead singer of The Undertones
 14 August – Philip Dunne, Conservative politician and MP for Ludlow
 19 August – Gordon Brand Jnr, Scottish professional golfer (died 2019) 
 20 August – Nicholas Bell, English actor based in Australia
 29 August – Lenny Henry, British entertainer
 30 August – Muriel Gray, Scottish author, broadcaster and journalist
 31 August – Stephen Cottrell, English Anglican bishop
 13 September – Bobby Davro, English actor and comedian
 18 September – Linda Lusardi, British model, actress and television presenter
 21 September – Simon Mayo, British radio presenter
 23 September – Danielle Dax, British experimental musician
 27 September – Irvine Welsh, Scottish novelist
 4 October – Anneka Rice, Welsh-born television presenter
 14 October – Thomas Dolby, English musician
 17 October – Craig Murray, UK Ambassador to Uzbekistan
 20 October
 Dave Finlay, Northern Irish professional wrestler
 Mark King, English jazz-funk singer and slap-style bass guitarist (Level 42) 
 25 October – Phil Daniels, English actor
 26 October – Shaun Woodward, British Labour politician and MP for St Helens South
 27 October – Simon Le Bon, English new wave singer-songwriter (Duran Duran)
 1 November – Mark Austin, English newsreader (ITN)
 2 November – Mark Phillip Hendrick, British Labour Co-operative politician and MP for Preston
 19 November – Isabella Blow, British fashion journalist (died 2007)
 22 November – Bruce Payne, English actor and producer 
 24 November – Nick Knight, photographer 
 25 November – Kim Ashfield, model
 2 December – Andrew George, British Liberal Democrat politician and MP for St Ives
 5 December – Dynamite Kid, English professional wrestler (died 2018) 
 6 December – Nick Park, English filmmaker and animator
 14 December
 Mike Scott, Scottish folk rock singer-songwriter (The Waterboys) 
 Spider Stacy, English Celtic punk tin whistle player and singer-songwriter (The Pogues) 
 18 December – Joseph Comerford, hydraulic engineer (died 2000)
 19 December – Limahl, English pop singer
 21 December – Kevin Blackwell, English football manager

Unknown date
 Adrian Bradshaw, army commander
 Omar Bakri Muhammad, Syrian-born Muslim cleric

Deaths
 4 January – John Anderson, 1st Viscount Waverley, civil servant and politician (born 1882)
 6 February – Manchester United F.C. players and associates in the Munich air disaster:
 Roger Byrne, team captain (born 1929)
 Geoff Bent (born 1932)
 Eddie Colman (born 1936)
 Mark Jones (born 1933)
 David Pegg (born 1935)
 Tommy Taylor (born 1932)
 Billy Whelan (born 1935)
 Frank Swift (born 1913), journalist and former Manchester City F.C. and England goalkeeper
 11 February – Ernest Jones, Welsh psychoanalyst (born 1879)
 13 February – Christabel Pankhurst, English suffragette (born 1880)
 21 February – Duncan Edwards, Manchester United footballer (born 1936)
 26 March – Phil Mead, English cricketer (born 1887)
 16 April – Rosalind Franklin, British crystallographer (born 1920)
 19 April – Billy Meredith, Welsh footballer (born 1874)
 3 May – Frank Foster, English cricketer (born 1889)
 19 May – Ronald Colman, English actor (born 1891)
 9 June – Robert Donat, English film and stage actor (born 1905)
 13 June – Edwin Keppel Bennett, British writer (born 1887)
 28 June – Alfred Noyes, English poet (born 1880)
 15 July – Julia Lennon, mother of John Lennon (born 1914)
 20 July – Margaret Haig Thomas, Viscountess Rhondda, political campaigner and businesswoman (born 1883)
 26 August – Ralph Vaughan Williams, British composer (born 1872)
 25 September – Henry Arthur Evans, Welsh Conservative politician (born 1898)
 2 October – Marie Stopes, birth control advocate, suffragette and palaeontologist (born 1880)
 17 October – Charlie Townsend, English cricketer (born 1876)
 24 October – G. E. Moore, philosopher, author of Principia Ethica (born 1873)
 28 October – Stephen Butterworth, physicist and engineer (born 1885)
 30 October – Rose Macaulay, novelist (born 1881)
 24 November – Lord Robert Cecil, English politician and diplomat, recipient of the Nobel Peace Prize (born 1864)
 30 November – Gareth Jones, actor (born 1925) 
 2 December – Alan McKibbin, Northern Irish politician (born 1892)

See also
 1958 in British music
 1958 in British television
 List of British films of 1958

References

 
Years of the 20th century in the United Kingdom